Tourism in Odisha is one of the main contributors to the Economy of Odisha, India, with a  long coastline, mountains, lakes, natural biodiversity and rivers. Odisha is one of the major tourism sectors of India, with various tourists' attractions, ranging from wildlife reserves, beaches, temples, monuments, the arts and festivals. Other than wildlife reserves, beaches, temples, monuments, the arts and festivals, the Odisha Tourism Development Corporation, a Public Sector Undertaking of Government of Odisha, is also developing tourism sector of Odisha and India.

Monuments

Temples
The major temples of Odisha are present in Ekamra Kshetra or the temple city of Bhubaneswar, Puri, Jajpur and Ganjam.

Some other temples in the state includes,

Buddhist monuments
 Dhauli
 Lalitgiri
 Pushpagiri
 Ratnagiri
 Udayagiri

Jain monuments
 Udayagiri and Khandagiri Caves

Forts
 Barabati Fort
 Chudanga Gada
 Raibania Fort
 Sisupalgarh

Flora and fauna

Lakes
 
 Chilka Lake: at the mouth of the Daya River, is Asia's largest brackish water lake and second largest brackish water lake in the world.  A bird sanctuary for millions of migratory birds, and is also noted for its population of Irrawaddy dolphins (Orcaella brevirostris), the only known population of Irrawaddy dolphins in India. It is one of only two lagoons in the world that are home to these species.
 Tampara Lake: Tampara Lake is one of the largest fresh water lakes in the state near Berhampur. The beautiful lake & the nearby Chilika Lagoon highlight the ecological diversity Odisha is blessed with. While Tampara is a fresh water lake, Chilika is a brackish water lagoon.
 Kanjia Lake: Lake inside the Nandankanan Zoological Park known for boat riding and scenic beauty situated at Bhubaneswar, Odisha, India. 
 Anshupa Lake: a horseshoe shaped fresh water lake on the left bank of the Mahanadi River, opposite Banki in Cuttack district, Odisha, India. Anshupa Lake in Banki is 40 km from the city of Cuttack, which also acts as a shelter for the migratory birds in the wintry weather season.

Waterfalls
 Badaghagara Waterfall
 Barehipani Falls
 Devkund Waterfall
 Duduma Waterfalls
 Joranda Falls
 Khandadhar Falls, Kendujhar
 Khandadhar Falls, Sundagarh
 Koilighugar Waterfall
 Sanaghagara Waterfall

Hot springs
 Atri
 Deulajhari
 Taptapani
 Tarabalo

Wildlife

Odisha is a remarkable place as it is the home to the royal Bengal tiger, consisting of many sanctuaries and natural scenic spots.

Beaches

Odisha has a long coastline of 500 km. Notable beaches on this coastline include:

 Gopalpur Beach
 Chandipur Beach
 Chandrabhaga Beach
 Gahirmatha Beach
 Puri Beach
 Talasari Beach

Sanctuaries
 Baisipalli Wildlife Sanctuary
 Balimela Wildlife Sanctuary
 Balukhand-Konark Wildlife Sanctuary
 Bhitarkanika Mangroves
 Bhitarkanika National Park
 Chandaka Elephant Sanctuary
 Debrigarh Wildlife Sanctuary
 Hadgarh Wildlife Sanctuary
 Karlapat Wildlife Sanctuary
 Kondakameru Wildlife Sanctuary
 Lakhari Valley Wildlife Sanctuary
 Nandankanan Zoological Park
 Satkosia Tiger Reserve
 Sunabeda Tiger Reserve

Scenic spots
 Daringbadi
 Barunei
 Dhamra
 Chandbali
 Gupteswar Cave
 Tensa
 Saptasajya
 Satabhaya
 Balda Cave

Islands
Eco-tourism provides a degree of alternate employment to the local community and generates environmental awareness, among local residents as well as visitors, about the conservation and sensible use of the lake's natural resources. Notable locations within the lake are:

 Ramba Bay at the southern end of the lake with the group of islands including:
 The Becon Island, with an architectural conical pillar (to put a light on the top) built by Mr. Snodgrass, the then collector of Ganjam of the East India Company, on a mass of rock in the Rambha Bay near Ghantasila hill.  It is surrounded by the Eastern Ghat.
 The Breakfast Island, pear shaped, known as "Sankuda island", with remnants of a dilapidated bungalow constructed by the King of Kalikote, has rare plants and is full of greenery with appealing flora.
 Honeymoon Island,  from Rambha Jetty, known as Barkuda Island, with clear waters has abundant red and green macro algae in the bed is also known for the limbless lizard, an endemic species found here.
 Somolo and Dumkudi islands, located in the Central and Southern sectors of the lake, in the backdrop of scenic Khalikote hill range, are inundated remnants of the Eastern Ghats with rich flora and fauna and also known for sighting of Irrawaddy dolphins.
 Parikud is a group of composite islands in the Garh Krishnaprasad Block for nature lovers and provides an avian spectacle during winter season.
 Kalijai Temple located on an island is considered to be the abode of the Goddess Kalijai.
 Satpada, at the new mouth of the lake, provides a beautiful view of the lake and also views of the dolphins. Hundreds of boats here provide tours of the lake for tourists.
 Barunkuda, a small island situated near Magarmukh, mouth of the lake, has a temple of Lord Varuna.
 Nabagraha is an ancient deity located along the outer channel.
 Chourbar Shiva Temple is located near Alupatna village, along the outer channel.
 Manikpatna, located on the outer channel has historical evidence of a port which was used for trade with Far East and also has the Bhabakundeswar temple of Lord Shiva, an old Mosque whose entrance door is made of the jaws of the whale.

Museums
 Odisha State Museum
 Regional Museum of Natural History, Bhubaneswar
 Tribal Research Institute Museum
 Odisha Crafts Museum

Odisha Tourism Development Corporation
The Odisha Tourism Development Corporation promotes tourism in the state and operate some of the existing tourist bungalows and transportation fleets in commercial line. OTDC's tourist bungalows are called panthanivas. Odisha Forest Development Corporation manages eco-tourism destinations in the state.

Locations of panthanivas

Gallery

Outline of tourism in India

 List of World Heritage Sites in India
 List of national parks of India
 List of lakes of India
 List of waterfalls in India
 List of State Protected Monuments in India
 List of beaches in India
 Incredible India
 List of Geographical Indications in India
 Medical tourism in India
 List of botanical gardens in India
 List of hill stations in India
 List of gates in India
 List of zoos in India
 List of protected areas of India
 List of aquaria in India
 List of forts in India
 List of forests in India
 Buddhist pilgrimage sites in India
 Hindu pilgrimage sites in India
 List of rock-cut temples in India
 Wildlife sanctuaries of India
 List of rivers of India
 List of mountains in India
 List of ecoregions in India
 Coral reefs in India
 List of stadiums in India

References

External links

 Official site
 7 Greatest Temples Of Odisha Other Than Jagannath Temple
 Heritage Tours Odisha - Odisha Tour Packages (Recognised by Odisha Tourism & Ministry of Tourism Government of India)

 
Articles containing video clips